EXEC II is a discontinued operating system developed for the UNIVAC 1107 by Computer Sciences Corporation (CSC) while under contract to UNIVAC to develop the machine's COBOL compiler. They developed EXEC II because Univac's EXEC I operating system development was late. Because of this the COBOL compiler was actually designed to run under EXEC II, not EXEC I as specified in the original contract.

EXEC II is a batch processing operating system that supports a single job stream with concurrent spooling.

See also
List of UNIVAC products
History of computing hardware

References

External links

EXEC 2